Vukotić is a Montenegrin surname, derived from the male given name "Vukota". It may refer to:
Bisera Vukotić (born 1944), Yugoslav-born Italian film actress and producer
Dušan Vukotić (1927–1998), Yugoslav cartoonist, author and director of animated films
Dubravka Vukotić (born 1976), Montenegrin actress
Janko Vukotić (1866–1927), Montenegrin General and Vojvoda from Montenegro
Princess Milena Vukotić (1847–1923), Queen Consort of Montenegro as the wife of King Nicholas I of Montenegro
Milena Vukotic (born 1938), Italian ballerina and actress
Miodrag Vukotić (born 1973), retired Montenegrin football player
Momčilo Vukotić (born 1950), Serbian football manager and a former football player
Veselin Vukotić, Montenegrin criminal and hitman

Serbian surnames
Montenegrin surnames
Slavic-language surnames
Patronymic surnames